The Security State Bank, on Garfield St. in Willow Lake, South Dakota, was built in 1909.  It was listed on the National Register of Historic Places in 2002.

It is a two-story brick commercial building with a flat roof.

It was deemed significant architecturally as "a representative example of an early 20th century commercial building."  It was also deemed important "for its contribution to commerce and economic development in Willow Lake, South Dakota. Willow Lake is a rural community whose primary source of economic activity is agricultural. Rural banks of this type were critical for the economic stability of this community and conservatism."

References

Bank buildings on the National Register of Historic Places in South Dakota
Early Commercial architecture in the United States
Commercial buildings completed in 1909
Clark County, South Dakota